Joseph Oluwaseun Onabolu (born May 17, 1994), is a Canadian recording artist, singer and songwriter from Brampton, Ontario. In March 2016, Joseph released his debut EP, followed by his second EP From The Stars Above in August 2016.

Career 

In February 2016, Joseph Onabolu released his first single "All On Me". Production was done by Eestbound, who is signed to Canadian record producer WondaGurl. Joseph followed that with a second single called "Lonely" produced by FrancisGotHeat, who was part of the production team for Drake's More Life playlist. On March 31, 2016, Vice Magazine premiered Joseph's first EP Brad Bonds on their website.

Artistry 
Joseph Onabolu has said some of his biggest influences are Elvis, The Beatles, and Ed Sheeran. He has been compared to John Legend.

Discography

Singles 

 Lonely
 All On Me
 Passing
 Don't Be Shy

Extended plays 

 From The Stars Above

References 

1994 births
Living people
Canadian male singer-songwriters
Musicians from Toronto
21st-century Canadian male singers